Timothy Cathcart (7 July 1994 – 15 August 2014) was a Northern Irish rally driver from Enniskillen who was killed at the 2014 Todds Leap Ulster Rally, a round of the 2014 British Rally Championship season, after his car, a Citroën DS3 R3T left the road and crashed near Fivemiletown. Timothy was from a family steeped in rallying history and started his rallying career in the Rallysport Association Championship, competing in a Vauxhall Nova and winning a number of events in his class.  He was into his second year in the British Rally Championship and was tipped to be a future talent in British and potentially World Rallying.

Cathcart's co-driver Dai Roberts was injured and airlifted to a Belfast hospital but made a full recovery. Dai's brother Gareth Roberts, also a co-driver, died in a similar accident at the Targa Florio in June 2012.

References

1994 births
2014 deaths
Rally drivers from Northern Ireland
Sport deaths in Northern Ireland
People from Enniskillen